The 1996 Tour de France was the 83rd edition of the Tour de France, starting on 29 June and ending on 21 July, featuring 19 regular stages, 2 individual time trials, a prologue and a rest day (10 July). It was won by Danish rider Bjarne Riis.

This Tour was noted by the "fall" of favourite Miguel Induráin, ending his record run of five consecutive victories. The course included a stage through his home town Villava, however he suffered a bronchitis because of the poor weather in the first week, and was fined and penalised for accepting drinks illegally. Indurain started to lose time in stage 7, and finally ended 11th failing to win a single stage or spend one day in the yellow jersey.

Stage 9 was scheduled to be a 176 kilometer ride from Val-d'Isère to Sestriere.  However, due to appalling weather conditions, including snow, the organisers cut the stage to just 46 km.  Bjarne Riis won the stage and opened a crucial 44 second gap over Telekom teammate Jan Ullrich. Ullrich, only 22, really broke through in this Tour, and won the individual time trial of stage 20.

Over a decade after the race, several riders with Team Telekom confessed to doping offences around the period of the 1996 tour, including support riders Rolf Aldag, Udo Bölts, Christian Henn and Brian Holm and team masseur Jef d'Hont has admitted in his autobiography that there was organised use of EPO in the team. On 24 May 2007, Erik Zabel admitted to using EPO during the first week of the race. The winner of the Tour, Bjarne Riis, admitted on 25 May 2007 that he also used EPO during the Tour, as a result was asked by the International Cycling Union (UCI) to return the yellow jersey he received. So far, runner-up Jan Ullrich, who has been under suspicion of doping as a part of the Operación Puerto doping case, has not commented on allegations that he also used EPO. Third place Richard Virenque and fourth place Laurent Dufaux were implicated in the 1998 Festina scandal.

UCI lawyer Philippe Verbiest stated in 2007 that the statute of limitations for removing Riis as winner of the Tour de France had expired, "you cannot strip him of the title but it is possible not to mention it anymore ...  Because of what he admitted, he is not the winner of the Tour de France.  Riis did not win."  At the same time tour spokesman Philippe Sudres stated that: "We consider philosophically that he can no longer claim to have won." In 2007, Riis' victory was removed from the Tour de France, yet in 2008 they listed Riis as winner of Tour de France 1996, albeit with a remark about his confession.

Teams

The 18 teams on top of the UCI rankings at the start of 1996 automatically qualified for the Tour. Four wildcards were given, for a total of 22 teams.

The teams entering the race were:

Qualified teams

Invited teams

Route and stages

Race overview

The prologue was won by Alex Zülle two seconds ahead of specialist Chris Boardman as overall contenders Bjarne Riis and Miguel Induráin came in sixth and seventh respectively. Zulle held onto the yellow jersey through the first few flat stages but in stage 4 a half dozen riders not in overall contention escaped in a breakaway and stayed away finishing several minutes ahead of the main field putting Stéphane Heulot in the yellow jersey for a few days.

Stage six was an intermediate stage run in terrible weather conditions and was won by Dutchman Michael Boogerd. The inclement weather caused well over a dozen riders to abandon the race including Lance Armstrong who merely thought he was sick from riding in the rainy, cold weather as most of the other riders who abandoned were, but within a few months he would be diagnosed with the cancer that nearly killed him.

As the Tour entered the Alps there was a mountain ITT in stage eight which was won by Evgeni Berzin, whom had seized the lead in the overall classification following stage seven. In the time trial he finished more than thirty seconds better than Riis and gained just over a minute on Indurain, Tony Rominger and debutant Jan Ullrich who was having an impressive start to his first Tour.

Stage nine was a mountain stage that was shortened due to foul weather and was won by Riis, who in the process took enough time to put himself into yellow. He would maintain a narrow lead over the next several stages and by the time the race reached the Pyrenees Abraham Olano was in second just under a minute behind with Berzin in third, Rominger in fourth, Riis’ teammate Ullrich in fifth and five-time defending champion Miguel Induráin struggling to stay in the top ten nearly 5:00 back.

During stage sixteen Riis made a number of false attacks, even falling back and feigning exhaustion to get a look at Indurain, Rominger, Luttenberger, Virenque, Dufaux, Leblanc and Alano to read their faces before finally launching an attack on the Hautacam. He put close to a minute into most of the elite riders and beyond that into everybody else effectively winning the Tour and putting it beyond doubt that Indurain would not win his sixth tour.

Stage seventeen was won by Laurent Dufaux who in the process moved into fourth place overall, but Riis finished in the same time. A group of eight riders dropped the rest of the field in this stage and as a result Riis distanced himself from all of his rivals with his own teammate Ullrich moving into second overall and Richard Virenque moving into third place overall.

Stage nineteen ITT was the last opportunity for major changes to be made in the general classification and the stage was won by Ullrich who finished nearly a minute ahead of second-placed Indurain who had completely dominated Individual Times Trials at the Tour de France for the previous several years. Riis had plenty of time to spare and was 1:41 ahead of his teammate Ullrich in the General Classification. Richard Virenque rounded out the podium also winning the mountains classification.

Even though rider admissions and investigations in the subsequent years showed that Tours during this time period were undoubtedly tainted by doping 1996 winner Riis, 1997 winner Ullrich and 1998 winner Pantani all officially retain their Tour victories. Pantani died just a few years after his Tour victory, as a result of mental health issues resulting from constant attacks from the press and Ullrich had some results voided later in his career, but his four 2nd-place finishes to Lance Armstrong and his 1996 2nd place to Riis remain on his record.

Classification leadership and minor prizes

There were several classifications in the 1996 Tour de France. The most important was the general classification, calculated by adding each cyclist's finishing times on each stage. The cyclist with the least accumulated time was the race leader, identified by the yellow jersey; the winner of this classification is considered the winner of the Tour.

Additionally, there was a points classification, which awarded a green jersey. In the points classification, cyclists got points for finishing among the best in a stage finish, or in intermediate sprints. The cyclist with the most points lead the classification, and was identified with a green jersey.

There was also a mountains classification. The organisation had categorised some climbs as either hors catégorie, first, second, third, or fourth-category; points for this classification were won by the first cyclists that reached the top of these climbs first, with more points available for the higher-categorised climbs. The cyclist with the most points lead the classification, and wore a white jersey with red polka dots.

The fourth individual classification was the young rider classification, which was not marked by a jersey. This was decided the same way as the general classification, but only riders under 26 years were eligible.

For the team classification, the times of the best three cyclists per team on each stage were added; the leading team was the team with the lowest total time.

In addition, there was a combativity award given after each mass-start stage to the cyclist considered most combative. The decision was made by a jury composed of journalists who gave points. The cyclist with the most points from votes in all stages led the combativity classification. Richard Virenque won this classification, and was given overall the super-combativity award. The Souvenir Henri Desgrange was given in honour of Tour founder Henri Desgrange to the first rider to pass the summit of the Col d'Aubisque on stage 17. This prize was won by Neil Stephens.

In stage 1, Chris Boardman wore the green jersey.

Final standings

General classification

Points classification

Mountains classification

Young rider classification

Team classification

Combativity classification

See also
 List of doping cases in cycling

Notes

References

Bibliography

External links

 
1996 Tour de France results at Cyclingnews.com

 
1996 in road cycling
1996
1996 in French sport
1996 in Dutch sport
June 1996 sports events in Europe
July 1996 sports events in Europe